Katie Jane Grande-Allen (born December 15) is an American bioengineer currently the Isabel C. Cameron Professor at Rice University. She is currently chair of the Department of Bioengineering at Rice University. Her research focuses on an engineering approach to heart disease.

Early life and education
Grande-Allen earned her Bachelor of Arts in Mathematics and Biology from Transylvania University. She then moved to the University of Washington for her Phd in Bioengineering. She subsequently conducted her postdoctoral fellowship in biomedical engineering with the Cleveland Clinic Foundation.

Career
Grande-Allen joined the faculty at Rice University in 2003 and began conducting research on the biochemical composition of heart valves in patients with congestive heart failure. She earned the 2011 A.J. Durelli Award by the Society for Experimental Mechanics Inc. as a result of her experimental test on tissue function, strength, growth and abnormalities.

By 2011, she earned the Established Investigator Award from the American Heart Association and received a $1.2 million grant from the National Institutes of Health to research replacement heart valves. A few years later, she was elected a Fellow of the American Association for the Advancement of Science for her contributions to the field of heart-valve biomechanics and mechanobiolog.

In 2017, Grande-Allen was chosen to replace Rebecca Richards-Kortum as director of the Rice Institute of Biosciences and Bioengineering. In the same year, she was elected a Fellow of the Biomedical Engineering Society and named chair of the bioengineering department.

She has also been elected a Fellow of the American Heart Association and Society for Experimental Mechanics.

References

Year of birth missing (living people)
Living people
Rice University faculty
American bioengineers
University of Washington College of Engineering alumni
Transylvania University alumni
Fellows of the American Institute for Medical and Biological Engineering
Fellows of the American Association for the Advancement of Science
Fellows of the Biomedical Engineering Society
Fellows of the Society for Experimental Mechanics